Chart Shop TV was a  short-lived British television channel owned and operated by CSC Media Group. Launched 6 October 2002 (following on from the launch of sister channel Chart Show TV), it closed in March 2003. The channel was listed in the Shopping section of the Sky Digital programme guide. Following the closure of the shopping service, its broadcast capacity was later used to launch a second music service, The Vault later in 2003.

Notes and references

CSC Media Group
Defunct television channels in the United Kingdom
Television channels and stations established in 2002
Television channels and stations disestablished in 2003
2002 establishments in the United Kingdom
Shopping networks in the United Kingdom